The Secret Circle is a supernatural, young-adult series of books created by L. J. Smith. The narrative follows the character of Cassie Blake as she is initiated into a "Circle" of eleven other teenage witches and the danger that ensues when they accidentally unleash a dark force upon their town. Matters are further complicated when Cassie finds herself in a love triangle that threatens to tear the Circle apart.

Novels
The Initiation (1992) 
The Captive (1992) 
The Power (1992) 
The Divide (2012)  (Written by Aubrey Clark)
The Hunt (2012)  (Written by Aubrey Clark)
The Temptation (2013)  (Written by Aubrey Clark)

Omnibuses

The Initiation and The Captive Part I (2008) 
The Captive Part II and The Power (2008)

Television adaptation

On October 28, 2010 L. J. Smith announced that the series had been optioned for a TV series by The CW. On February 27, 2011, The CW picked up The Secret Circle with Dawson's Creek creator and The Vampire Diaries co-creator/executive producer Kevin Williamson attached. However, Williamson told The CW that The Vampire Diaries companion series he had been helming was put on hold as he did not have enough time for it. Williamson worked on an original script penned by Andrew Miller, creator of the Emmy-nominated web series Imaginary Bitches, with writer credit shared by both men.
On February 16, 2011, The Secret Circle booked Liz Friedlander to direct the pilot. Friedlander also directed episodes for The Vampire Diaries, Pretty Little Liars, 90210 and One Tree Hill.

On September 15, 2011, The Secret Circle debuted on The CW following its sister series The Vampire Diaries.

On May 11, 2012, The CW cancelled the series. Several fan campaigns and petitions to ask the network to reconsider, to ship the show to another network or even to have a home video release of the series have thus far been unsuccessful.

References

Novel series
Works by L. J. Smith (author)
Witchcraft in written fiction